"If You Know What I Mean" is a song written and recorded by Neil Diamond.  It is a track from Diamond's 1976 album, Beautiful Noise, and was his third number 1 on the Easy Listening chart, where it spent two weeks. "If You Know What I Mean" went to number 1 for two nonconsecutive weeks and peaked at number 11 on the Billboard Hot 100. In Canada, the song reached number 19 on the pop singles chart and hit number 1 on the Adult Contemporary chart.

Background
Billboard described "If You Know What I Mean" as a "powerful ballad," stating that Diamond sings with more emotion than he had in the recent past, and also praising Robbie Robertson's production.  Cash Box said that  the song "has a couple of diverse, yet distinct musical moods" and that "the chorus, underscored by a first class string section, builds the song up to an emotional peak."

Diamond has stated that the song is a "tender recollection" of a relationship in his teens, in which he successfully seduced a significantly older woman.

Chart history

Weekly charts

Year-end charts

See also
List of number-one adult contemporary singles of 1976 (U.S.)

References

External links
 

1976 songs
1976 singles
Neil Diamond songs
Columbia Records singles
Songs written by Neil Diamond
Song recordings produced by Robbie Robertson
Songs about nostalgia